Lawrence Clayton "Larry" Elkins (born July 28, 1943) is a former American football player. He was a two-time All-American flanker at Baylor and later for the AFL's Houston Oilers.

Early life
Elkins is the youngest of ten children. One of his mother's ex-husbands was Marshall Ratliff, best known as one of three perpetrators of the infamous Santa Claus Bank Robbery.

College career
Elkins was an all-around athletic star at Brownwood High School and turned down a $25,000 baseball offer to enroll at Baylor University. He had received an offer from the Texas Longhorns, then coached by legend Darrell Royal, but chose Baylor on the recommendation of his high school coach Gordon Wood, who felt that the Bears' pro-style offense suited Elkins better. One of the best receivers in Baylor history, Elkins set an NCAA record with his seventy catches in 1963. Elkins also played safety for the defense and returned kicks. In 1962, he had a ninety-two-yard punt return against TCU. For his career, he caught 144 passes for 2,094 yards with a school-record nineteen touchdowns. He still shares Baylor's single-game record for receptions with twelve, which he caught against Texas in 1963. He ranks number three in all-time career receptions and career receiving yards.

Elkins was a consensus All-American his last two years (1963, 1964) — Baylor's first-ever two-time consensus pick. He played in the 1965 East-West Shrine Game, Coaches All-America Game, and Hula Bowl. He was MVP of the Hula Bowl. He appeared on the Tonight Show Dec. 3, 1964 as part of the Look Magazine All-American Football Team with his contemporaries Fred Biletnikoff, Craig Morton and Gale Sayers. He was chosen by Johnny Carson because of his deep Texas accent to simulate a television commercial.

Elkins was inducted into the Baylor Athletic Hall of Fame in 1976 and into the College Football Hall of Fame in 1994.

Professional career
He was drafted in the first round of the 1965 NFL Draft by the Green Bay Packers and second overall in the 1965 AFL Draft by the Houston Oilers, one selection after the New York Jets drafted Alabama quarterback Joe Namath. He was with Houston from 1965 to 1968. He suffered a knee injury in training camp with the Oilers in 1965 and was not on their active roster that year. His first season was 1966.

But Elkins' pro career never really got off the ground. After going to the Steelers, he broke his collarbone in a 1969 preseason game after earning a starting job with the Pittsburgh Steelers. "Rather unlucky, I suppose," he told the Baylor Line in 2001.

After football
After leaving football, Elkins became something of a globe-trotter. From 1971 to 1978, he worked for Brown and Root Inc. in the safety, health, and claims department, both in the United States and in Europe. From 1979-82, he worked with off-shore drilling companies in the Gulf of Mexico and in Africa. Elkins described the years of 1982 to 1989 as "various midlife crises endeavors, including stints with the artistic peoples in the entertainment business." He spent ten months renovating parts of Robert Duvall's horse farm in Virginia and took the actor all over Texas to research accents for his 1983 movie Tender Mercies. When Duvall won the Oscar the movie that year, Elkins was there as his special guest.

Duvall also asked him to find him the voice and character of Augustus McRae in Lonesome Dove.  Elkins introduced him to the legendary quarterback, Sammy Baugh, who was retired to his ranch in Rotan, Texas.  Elkins said he also rubbed shoulders with Gene Hackman, Robert De Niro, Meryl Streep, and Robert Redford during those years.

After that, Elkins spent more than a dozen years in Saudi Arabia, where he was a consultant for the country's Ministry of Water, which managed twenty-six desalination plants and several pipelines and pumping stations along the Red Sea and Persian Gulf.

Elkins retired and moved back to his hometown of Brownwood and lived for ten years overlooking beautiful Lake Brownwood. He now lives at the top of The Hill Country in Clifton, Texas on a dry creek bed.

References

See also
Other American Football League players

1943 births
Living people
All-American college football players
American football wide receivers
Baylor Bears football players
College Football Hall of Fame inductees
Houston Oilers players
American Football League players
Players of American football from Houston